San Buenaventura is a municipality in the Usulután department of El Salvador.

Sports
The local football club is named C.D. España and it currently plays in the Salvadoran Third Division.

Municipalities of the Usulután Department